Murad Khachayev (born on 14 April 1998) is a professional footballer who plays as a midfielder who plays for Sumgayit in the Azerbaijan Premier League. Born in Ukraine, he represents the Azerbaijan national team.

Career

Club
On 11 August 2018, Khachayev made his debut in the Azerbaijan Premier League for Sumgayit match against Neftçi Baku.

International
He made his debut for Azerbaijan national football team on 27 May 2021 in a friendly against Turkey.

References

External links
 

1998 births
Living people
Footballers from Luhansk
Association football midfielders
Azerbaijani footballers
Azerbaijan youth international footballers
Azerbaijan international footballers
Ukrainian footballers
Ukrainian people of Azerbaijani descent
Azerbaijani expatriate footballers
Expatriate footballers in Ukraine
Azerbaijan Premier League players
FC Shakhtar Donetsk players
Sumgayit FK players